The 1918 East Grinstead by-election was held on 29 July 1918.  The by-election was held due to the incumbent Conservative MP, Henry Cautley, becoming Recorder of Sunderland.  It was retained by Cautley who was unopposed.

References

1918 elections in the United Kingdom
1918 in England
20th century in Sussex
By-elections to the Parliament of the United Kingdom in West Sussex constituencies
Unopposed ministerial by-elections to the Parliament of the United Kingdom (need citation)
East Grinstead
July 1918 events